Heorhiy Frolovych Borzenko (born 1927) is a former Soviet footballer, a forward.

Borzenko spent most of his playing career with FC Lokomotyv Kharkiv in 1947-55. After the team was taken out of competition, he played for a season with Avanhard Kharkiv and then Khimik Dniprodzerzhynsk. In 1953 Borzenko was recognized as the Ukrainian player of the year.

Career statistics

Club

References

External links
Татьяна Лазарева. Нечаянная радость. Вечерний Харьков. 13 апреля 2007 г.
Виктор Галич. Как харьковчане отомстили москвичам. Вечерний Харьков. 31 июля 2009 г.
 Profile at klisf
 

1927 births
Possibly living people
Ukrainian footballers
Soviet footballers
FC Lokomotyv Kharkiv players
FC Metalist Kharkiv players
Soviet Top League players
Soviet First League players
Association football forwards